Charles Proctor (January 4, 1906 – February 1, 1996) was an American skier. He competed at the 1928 Winter Olympics.

References

1906 births
1996 deaths
American male cross-country skiers
American male Nordic combined skiers
American male ski jumpers
Olympic cross-country skiers of the United States
Olympic Nordic combined skiers of the United States
Olympic ski jumpers of the United States
Cross-country skiers at the 1928 Winter Olympics
Nordic combined skiers at the 1928 Winter Olympics
Ski jumpers at the 1928 Winter Olympics
Sportspeople from Columbia, Missouri
20th-century American people